Ascenzio Guerrieri (died 1645) was a Roman Catholic prelate who served as Bishop of Castellaneta (1635–1645).

Biography
On 7 May 1635, Ascenzio Guerrieri was appointed during the papacy of Pope Urban VIII as Bishop of Castellaneta.
On 13 May 1635, he was consecrated bishop by Francesco Maria Brancaccio, Cardinal-Priest of Santi XII Apostoli, with Giacomo Theodoli, Bishop of Forlì and Alessandro Suardi, Bishop of Lucera, serving as co-consecrators.
He served as Bishop of Castellaneta until his death in 1645.

References 

17th-century Italian Roman Catholic bishops
Bishops appointed by Pope Urban VIII
1645 deaths